Bengt Ahlström (24 December 1924 – 22 October 2001) was a Finnish rower. He competed in the men's coxless pair event at the 1952 Summer Olympics.

References

External links
 

1924 births
2001 deaths
Finnish male rowers
Olympic rowers of Finland
Rowers at the 1952 Summer Olympics
People from Jakobstad
Sportspeople from Ostrobothnia (region)